Ikot Okoro is a rural settlement of Akwa Ibom State and was one of the larger population concentrations in the now defunct South Eastern Nigeria. The people of Ikot Okoro have been clamoring for the creation of a local Government area (LGA) from the present day Oruk Anam LGA. Oruk Anam LGA incidentally happens to be one of the biggest LGA in Nigeria and as such grassroots development have not been felt in most part of the LGA especially in Ikot Okoro. It is noteworthy to state that successive administrations in the past have neglected this once prosperous and dynamic area. It is the belief of the general population that once the actualization of the Annang State or ITAI state is achieved, Ikot Okoro will reclaim its lost glory.

Ikot Okoro is home to a general hospital (Ikot Okoro General Hospital), magistrate court, police station, and post office. At the height of Ikot Okoro's prosperity, traders called the Umannis from the east of Nigeria, notably those from Arochukwu in Abia State settled there. present day Ikot Okoro has a high school / comprehensive secondary school and two primary schools. It is connected to the National grid and has effective telecommunication reception from any of the wireless telecommunication companies in Nigeria. The slight relief that Ikot Okoro has today is a road construction that runs from Ikot Ntuen through Asanga to Urua Atim, IKOT OKORO which makes it possible for commercial activities to commence once again after almost 40 years of neglect due to ethnic politics that played out in Akwa Ibom State after the civil war.

References

Towns in Oruk Anam
Populated places in Akwa Ibom State